Jedlička (feminine Jedličková) is a Czech surname, meaning a small fir tree.

Notable persons with the surname include:

 Arnošt Jedlička (1888–1968), Czech entomologist
 Josef Jedlička (1927–1990), Czech writer
 Marie Jedličková, Czech opera singer
 Martin Jedlička, Czech footballer
 Michal Jedlička (born 1973), Czech orienteering competitor
 Rudolf Jedlička, Czech physician, founder of Jedlička’s Institute
 Vít Jedlička (born 1983), Czech politician and activist

Czech-language surnames